Keith Middleton (born March 7, 1931) is an Australian former professional rugby league footballer who played in the 1940s and 1950s. He played for North Sydney and South Sydney in the NSWRL competition as a centre.

Playing career
Middleton was originally from Bermagui on the New South Wales South Coast but made the move to Sydney and signed for Norths in 1948.  In 1950, Middleton was selected to play for Australia and made 3 appearances all against Great Britain winning the best of 3 series 2–1.  Also in 1950, Middleton was selected to play for New South Wales against Queensland in the interstate series.

In 1952 and 1953, Middleton was a part of the Norths sides which reached the preliminary finals but fell short of a grand final appearance on both occasions, 1953 was also the final year that Middleton was selected for a representative side when he was selected to play for NSW City.  In 1956, Middleton joined South Sydney and played with the club for one season before retiring.

References

North Sydney Bears players
South Sydney Rabbitohs players
Rugby league centres
1931 births
Australia national rugby league team players
New South Wales City Origin rugby league team players
Living people